Josep Masachs Gelma (born 4 July 1983 in Sant Antoni de Vilamajor) is a Spanish handballer who plays for Știința Municipal Dedeman Bacău in the Romanian Liga Naţională.

Achievements    
Liga ASOBAL:
Winner: 2008
Copa del Rey:
Winner: 2008, 2013
Copa ASOBAL:
Winner: 2008
EHF Champions League:
Winner: 2008
IHF Super Globe:
Winner: 2012

References

1983 births
Spanish male handball players
Living people
People from Vallès Oriental
Sportspeople from the Province of Barcelona
Spanish expatriate sportspeople in Romania
Expatriate handball players
Liga ASOBAL players
BM Ciudad Real players
SDC San Antonio players
BM Granollers players
Handball players from Catalonia